Johanna Larsson was the defending champion, but lost in the second round to Kateřina Siniaková.

Yulia Putintseva won her first WTA Tour title, defeating Tamara Zidanšek in the final, 4–6, 6–4, 6–2.

Seeds

Draw

Finals

Top half

Bottom half

Qualifying

Seeds

Qualifiers

Draw

First qualifier

Second qualifier

Third qualifier

Fourth qualifier

Fifth qualifier

Sixth qualifier

References

External links
Main Draw
Qualifying Draw

Nürnberger Versicherungscup - Singles
2019 Singles